This is a list of international trips made by Ludwig Erhard, the 2nd Chancellor of Germany, during his tenure from 17 October 1963 to 30 November 1966.

Summary of international trips

References

Ludwig Erhard
Erhard
Trips
Erhard